Brackiella oedipodis is a Gram-negative, oxidase- and catalase-positive, rod-shaped, nonmotile, chemoorganotrophic bacterium of the genus Brackiella isolated from the heart of a cotton-topped tamarin Saguinus oedipus. It can cause endocarditis. Colonies of Brackiella oedipodis are greyish-white coloured.

References

External links
Type strain of Brackiella oedipodis at BacDive -  the Bacterial Diversity Metadatabase

Burkholderiales
Bacteria described in 2002